Silver Rain Radio is a Russian (including post-Soviet countries) FM radio station since July 4, 1995. Radio frequency in Moscow, Russia - 100,1 FM. Initiator of the Silver Galosh Award for the most dubious achievements in show business every year. This prize awarded at the congress-hall of Radisson-Slavyanskaya hotel. Is known to be the most eccentric radio station in Russia. The award can be compared to The Razzies.

History timeline 

 On February 3, 1996 awarded with the first "Quality Mark" Prize
 On March 26, 1996 first Silver Galosh '96 ceremony.
 Since October 20, 1996 starts online broadcasting.
 Was one of the sponsors of Russian Mars 96 artificial satellite launched on November 16, 1996
 On July 4, 1997 first morning show of Vladimir Soloviev aired
 On February 27, 1997 introduced the new broadcasting scheme music non-stop
 On January 15, 1997 started to transmit the RDS signals for car audio devices.
 On 1998 April Fool's Day started a Ukrainian broadcasting instead of the usual Russian. Also in the announcement on the previous day the promotion department constated the closing of Russian Office and the migration to Ukrainian FM space.
 On June 6, 1998 the Lowered Ball '98 football match held between the radiostation staff and the audience football teams.
 On December 31, 1999 special correspondent Alexander Begak raised a flag of Silver Rain Radio on the highest peak of Antarctica. The other record was in the air of Thailand when 572 paratroopers grouped around the same flag - this was a message of Happy Birthday to the King of Thailand.
 On January 25, 1999 first shows of Savik Schuster aired - football show Out of play and an informational project (together with Radio Svoboda)
 On December 31, 2000 a frost-resisting fountain full of Vodka opened , 
 On January 22, 2001 the new show of Yuriy Ohochinskiy Stars fall out of the sky about the most notable performers of 1950-1960-th aired
 Since January 17, 2002 the new electronic music and literary exquisites show of Vlad Copp Elements. Assembly Model aired (together with Mus-TV).
 On February 3, 2002 Lou Bega performs on the birthday of Silver Rain Radio 
 On June 3, 2002 the first interview of Rhythm and blues King James Brown in Russia 
 On November 20, 2002 became the first radiostation in Russia to present an Adriano Celentano's new album - Per sempre.
 On 2003 Valentine's Day a Monument to All in love opened during the Silver Kiss action in the Moscow Hermitage Garden. It was sold later for $4,000 in an act of charity to be erected again every year.
 On 2003 April Fool's Day the action Destroy Your Lavatory Pan held under the motto "You deserve to sit on better things!". Pans of some lucky guys were broken live and then replaced with the new wonder of sanitary engineering
 On June 10, 2003 Engelbert Humperdinck on Silver Rain Radio 
 On July 25, 2003 Jay-Jay Johanson on Silver Rain Radio
 On August 8, 2003 Toto Cutugnio on Silver Rain Radio 
 On December 9, 2003 Manfred Mann on Silver Rain Radio
 On May 18, 2004 B.B.King on Silver Rain Radio , 
 On August 4, 2004 Dani Klein (Vaya Con Dios) on Silver Rain Radio 
 On March 3, 2005 Earth Wind & Fire (Verdin White, Ralph Johnson) on Silver Rain Radio 
 On April 1, 2005 Freedom Dance (art-ballet) on Silver Rain Radio
 On April 22, 2005 Alan Parsons on Silver Rain Radio 
 On October 19, 2005 Phil Collins on Silver Rain Radio 
 On March 9, 2006 Chris Rea on Silver Rain Radio 
 On July 27, 2006 Jethro Tull on Silver Rain Radio 
 On August 8, 2006 Liza Minnelli on Silver Rain Radio 

Source: Silver Rain Radio Homepage (translated from Russian)

Staff 
 Elena Raskatova 
 Michael Plotnikov 
 Lyusiya Green 
 Pavel Vashekin
 Ekaterina Schevtsova 
 David Schneiderov 
 Philip Obruchev 
 Leonid Volodarskiy
 Eugene Bakaev and Vika Agapova 
 Vladimir Solovyov
 Savik Schuster
 Yuriy Ohochinskiy
 Vlad Copp
 Alex Dubas ("Something Good")

Former staff 
 Nikolay Pivnenko 
 Alexey Alexeyevich Eibojenko  and Konstantin Grigorievich Tsivilev  (surnames unknown, used collective pseudonym "Lazy-bones" or Lezheboki )

Address 
 Headquarters is located in Russia, Moscow, Petrovsko-Razumovskaya Alleya, 12A, 127083

Trivia 
 "To sit into Galosh" is the Russian colloquial phrase for "to get into a mess".

See also 
Dozhd (TV Rain), similarly-named broadcaster also co-founded by Natalya Sindeyeva
List of Russian-language radio stations

References

External links
Silver Rain Radio Homepage
Silver Rain Radio in Moscow Business Telephone Guide

Radio stations established in 1995
Radio stations in Russia
Russian-language radio stations